Nuria Llagostera Vives and María José Martínez Sánchez were the defending champions, and in the final, defeated Lourdes Domínguez Lino and Arantxa Parra Santonja, 6–4, 6–2.

Seeds

Draw

Draw

External links
Draw

Abierto Mexicano Telcel - Women's Doubles
2009 Abierto Mexicano Telcel